The AJW Championship was a tertiary belt in All Japan Women's Pro-Wrestling (AJW) promotion.  The first champion, in 1980, was Rimi Yokota. During the title's history, no one held the belt more than two times. The belt was abandoned in 2005 after AJW was closed down.

The AJW Championship first design was a brown belt that also represented the AJW Junior Championship. Later, its design was replaced by one inspired on Fabulous Moolah's World Women's Championship belt.

When the IWA World Championship was introduced in AJW in 1988, All Japan Women's Pro Wrestling worked with three regular tertiary singles belts. The WWWA World Single Championship and the All Pacific Championship were the most prestigious (world championship) and the second most prestigious (secondary championship) singles belts, respectively.

Title history

Combined reigns

Footnotes

See also

 List of professional wrestling promotions in Japan
 List of women's wrestling promotions
 Professional wrestling in Japan

References

External links
 AJW Championship title history.

All Japan Women's Pro-Wrestling Championships
Women's professional wrestling championships